Zhongzhou Holdings Financial Center is a  supertall skyscraper in Nanshan district, Shenzhen, Guangdong, China. Construction started in 2009 and was completed in 2014. The building is mixed-use and contains a 340-room Marriott hotel with a large atrium in the upper floors. The atrium is clearly visible from the outside.

Location
It is situated within the Nanshan CBD development within walking distance from Houhai Station of Shenzhen Metro. Neighbouring buildings include the Tencent Binhai Mansion, Shenzhen Bay Sports Center, One Shenzhen Bay, China Resources Headquarters and Coastal City.

See also

List of tallest buildings in Shenzhen
List of tallest buildings in China

References

Skyscraper hotels in Shenzhen
Skyscraper office buildings in Shenzhen
Buildings and structures completed in 2014